The Central New York Region (formerly the Central-Leatherstocking Region, also known as Leatherstocking Country) is a term used by the New York State Department of Economic Development to broadly describe the central region of New York for tourism purposes. The region roughly corresponds to the Mohawk and upper Susquehanna valleys. It is one of two partially overlapping regions that collectively identify as Central New York, the other being roughly equating to the Syracuse metropolitan area.

Geography 
The region includes the following counties and cities:
{|
| Broome County
| – Binghamton
|-
| Chenango County
| – Norwich
|-
| Herkimer County
| – Little Falls
|-
| Madison County
| – Oneida
|-
| Montgomery County
| – Amsterdam
|-
| Oneida County
| – Utica, Rome, Sherrill (smallest city in New York)
|-
| Otsego County
| – Oneonta, Cooperstown
|-
| Schoharie County
|– Cobleskill
|}

The region has a population of 764,240, according to the 2000 Census.

Travel and tourism 
The Central region of New York (formerly the Central-Leatherstocking Region) is a tourism region in New York State defined by the New York State Division of Tourism (I Love NY). It includes elements of the surrounding regions, forming a microcosm of the state as a whole, with hills and rivers, cities and farms, and places of hard work and recreation.

The eight-county area is known for its fresh produce and homemade goods from numerous family-run farms and farm stands, an abundance of B&Bs, country houses and inns offering overnight accommodations and culinary experiences, live musical and theatrical performances at various venues, year-round festivals, museums and exhibits exploring cultural heritage and ancestry, and trailblazing opportunities throughout its many forests and lakeside areas.

The National Baseball Hall of Fame and Museum is located within this region.

Popular culture 
Leatherstocking Country refers to the fictional character Natty Bumppo, featured by author James Fenimore Cooper in his collection of stories, Leatherstocking Tales, set in this region. Leatherstocking is a term for the leather leggings often worn by Indians to protect their legs from brush and briars in the woods.

References

Regions of New York (state)
Upstate New York